The Coronavirus Commission was a Norwegian government commission to conduct a review and assessment of the management of the COVID-19 pandemic by the Norwegian authorities. The commission was appointed on 24 April 2020 and is led by Stener Kvinnsland.

The Commission submitted its report to Prime Minister Erna Solberg on 14 April 2021.

Mandate

Members 
The following is a list of the members of the Coronavirus Commission:
 Stener Kvinnsland (Chairman)
 Astri Aas-Hansen
 Geir Sverre Braut
 Knut Eirik Dybdal
 Tone Fløtten
 Rune Jakobsen
 Toril Johansson
 Christine Korme
 Nina Langeland
 Egil Matsen
 Per Arne Olsen
 Pål Terje Rørby

Report

Reactions

Secrecy 
Jan Fridthjof Bernt criticised the 'extensive secrecy' surrounding the commission's work.

Representatives from the Labour Party, the Centre Party, and the Socialist People's Party were also critical.

See also 
 COVID-19 pandemic in Norway

References

External links 
 
 The Coronavirus Commission Report

COVID-19 pandemic in Norway
2020 establishments in Norway